The Gitanmaax Band is a band government of the Gitxsan people, based near the meeting of the Skeena and Bulkley Rivers, adjacent to the village of Hazelton and 5 km west of New Hazelton, in northwestern British Columbia, Canada.

Chief and Councillors

Treaty Process

History

Demographics
The Gitanmaax Band Council has 2,147 members.

Economic Development

Social, Educational and Cultural Programs and Facilities

References

History of British Columbia
Gitxsan governments
Skeena Country